McCall Point is a point on the east side of Lallemand Fjord,  northwest of Salmon Cove on the west coast of Pernik Peninsula, on the Loubet Coast of Graham Land, Antarctica. It was mapped from air photos taken by the Falkland Islands and Dependencies Aerial Survey Expedition, 1956–57, and was named by the UK Antarctic Place-Names Committee after American engineer John G. McCall (1923–54) of the University of Alaska, who first measured the detailed internal movement of a cirque glacier in 1951–52.

References

 SCAR Composite Gazetteer of Antarctica.

Headlands of Graham Land
Loubet Coast